The Palais de la Bourse is a building on place du Commerce in Nantes, France, begun at the end of the 18th century and completed in the 19th century. It was rebuilt at the end of the 20th century to house a branch of Fnac.

Neoclassical architecture in France
Buildings and structures in Nantes